Club Belgrano de San Nicolás is a professional basketball team in San Nicolás de los Arroyos, Argentina playing in the Liga Nacional de Básquetbol (LNB). Their home arena is Fortunato Bonelli Arena.

External links
Current team and information 

Basketball teams in Argentina
Basketball teams established in 1927